Töölö (formerly spelled Thölö) is the collective name for the neighbourhoods Etu-Töölö and Taka-Töölö in Helsinki, Finland. The neighbourhoods are located next to the city centre, occupying the western side of the Helsinki Peninsula.

Etu-Töölö, the southern neighbourhood, borders Kamppi and is the location of the Finnish Parliament House. Taka-Töölö, the northern neighbourhood, borders Meilahti and Laakso, and is the location of the Helsinki University Central Hospital. Contrary to popular belief, Töölö is no longer an official name of any district or neighbourhood in Helsinki; in 1959 Töölö was divided into Etu-Töölö and Taka-Töölö.

Overview

Töölö was built in 1920–1930 when Helsinki suffered from rapid population growth and needed more housing. It was the site of the first ever town planning competition in Finland in 1898–1900. Three entries were lifted out for recognition; first prize was awarded to architect Gustaf Nyström (together with engineer Herman Norrmén), second prize to architect Lars Sonck, and third prize to a joint entry by Sonck together with architects Bertil Jung and Valter Thomé. Nyström's scheme represented classicism with wide main streets and imposing public buildings arranged in symmetrical axial compositions, and the other two entries following two picturesque theories of town planning proposed at that time by Viennese city planner Camillo Sitte, with the street network adapted to the rocky terrain and with picturesque compositions. Undecided what course of action to take, however, the City Council asked the prize-winners to submit new proposals. When this led to further stalemate Nyström and Sonck were commissioned to work together on the final plan combining Nyström's spacious street network and elements of Sonck's Sittesque details. The final plan (1916) under the direction of Jung, made the scheme more uniform, while the architecture is seen as typical of the Nordic Classicism style. A typical street in the plan is that of Museokatu, with tall lines of buildings in a classical style along a curving street line. A still wider (24 metres) new tree-lined boulevard was that of Helsinginkatu, driven through the working-class district of Kallio, first outlined in 1887 by Sonck, but with further input from Nyström, and completed in around 1923. However, despite these wide streets there are also several Sitte-inspired picturesque streets and squares, most notably Temppeliaukio square (in the centre of which is the "church in the rock").

Töölö has always been the most respected as a place to live, but the prices of apartments are high, especially in Etu-Töölö. In Töölö, the marketing times for apartments are clearly shorter and the prices per square meter are therefore higher than in the rest of Helsinki on average, which speaks of abundant demand. A square of living in Töölö costs about €8,000, which is close to the price level of the second most popular district, Lauttasaari, but clearly less than in Ullanlinna, where a square of living costs closer to €10,000.

Töölö is also known for its functionalist architecture, notably around Taka-Töölö. There are many parks, including Hesperia Park on the Töölö Bay and also Sibelius Park, named after composer Jean Sibelius and containing a monument in his name. Töölö also has a vibrant cultural life, being the location of the Finnish National Opera, the National Museum of Finland, Kunsthalle Helsinki, the Zoological Museum, Töölö Library, and many small galleries and bookstores. With the Olympic Stadium, Sonera Stadium, the Sports Hall and the Ice Hall, all within walking distance from each other, Taka-Töölö is also a significant neighbourhood for sport life in Helsinki.

Notable people
 Eeva-Kaarina Aronen (1948–2015), author and journalist

Notable sights
Parliament 
Temppeliaukio church 
Kristuskyrkan Swedish church
The National Museum of Finland 
Finlandia Hall 
Finnish National Opera
Helsinki Olympic Stadium
Hietaniemi Cemetery
Cafe Regatta

See also
Kluuvi
Töölöntori

References

Gallery 

Neighbourhoods of Helsinki
Kampinmalmi district
Töölö